Disko Bay is a large bay on the western coast of Greenland. The bay constitutes a wide southeastern inlet of Baffin Bay.

Geography
{ "type": "ExternalData", "service": "geoshape", "ids": "Q1135227", "properties": { "fill": "#0050d0"}}

To the south the coastline is complicated with multiple waterways of skerries and small islands in the Aasiaat archipelago. Qasigiannguit and Ilimanaq are the main settlements in the southeastern inlet, just south of the outflow of Ilulissat Icefjord.

From the north the bay is bounded by Qeqertarsuaq, the largest island on the western coast. North of Ilulissat and west of Alluttoq Island the bay transforms into Sullorsuaq Strait separating Qeqertarsuaq from Nuussuaq Peninsula.

It is the largest open bay in western Greenland, measuring 150 km north to south and 100 km east to west. It has an average depth of 400 m and average water temperature of 3.5 °C, which in winter drops to −1.75 °C and then rises up to 12 °C in summer. This is changing, as the bay has been gradually warming up since 1997.

History 
 
Disko Bay has been an important location for centuries. Its coastline was first encountered by Europeans when Erik the Red started a settlement in 985 AD on the more habitable western coast of Greenland. The two settlements, called the Eastern and Western settlements, were sustenance economies that survived on animal husbandry and farming. Soon after the Western settlement was established, the Norsemen travelled up the coast during the summer thaw and discovered Disko Bay.

Their interest in this bay was due to its rich resources: walruses for ivory, seals for their pelts, and whales for a variety of materials. These products became the main source of income for the Greenlandic settlers who traded with Iceland, the British Isles, and mainland Europe. Without these resources the settlements would probably not have lasted as long as they did.

It is uncertain when the Inuit first started venturing into Disko Bay, but the Saqqaq were present there between 2400 and 900 BC.

Norse accounts describe the area as uninhabited when they first explored it. Norse accounts document an eventual trade arrangement with the Inuit who came from the north and west. For a time, both parties made peaceful use of the bay. Later accounts report fighting and massacres on both sides. However, the primary reason for the abandonment of the Greenlandic settlements was the advent of the Little Ice Age that started in the 15th century. There was such an extreme shift in temperature that Disko Bay became inaccessible even in the warmer summer months, thereby destroying the livelihood of the Greenlandic Norse. Even the Eastern settlement, which was below the Arctic Circle, became too cold for habitation. From that time until Danish colonization in the 18th century, the Inuit controlled the Disko Bay area although English and Dutch whalers sometimes visited the area after it was charted during John Davis's third Greenland expedition in 1587.

Wildlife

It is home to a wide range of species due to the nutrient-rich waters. This includes benthic and pelagic fish, such as capelin (Mallotus villosus) and cod (Gadus morhua). This attracts migratory seals such as harp (Pagophilus groenlandicus) and hooded seal (Cystophora cristata) and ringed (Pusa hispida) and bearded seal (Erignathus barbatus).

The bay is home during spring time to bowhead (Balaena mysticetus) and humpback (Megaptera novaeangliae) whales, as well as Pilot (Globicephala melas), killer whales (Orcinus orca) and narwhal (Monodon monoceros). On the shores, various birds can be found such as gulls, terns, eider ducks, guillemots, kittiwakes, cormorants and fulmars. Animals such as Arctic foxes, hares and ptarmigan can be found around the bay.

References

Literary references 
Disko Troop, a central character in Rudyard Kipling's novel Captains Courageous, was born on a fishing boat in the vicinity of Disko Bay and subsequently named after it.

Sources 
Brown, Berit ed. Nordic Experiences: Exploration of Scandinavian Cultures. Greenwood Press. Westport, CT. 1997.
Diamond, Jared. Collapse. Penguin Press Ltd. London, England. 2005.
Enterline, James Robert. Erikson, Eskimos, and Columbus. Johns Hopkins University Press. Baltimore, MD. 2002.
Haywood, John. The Encyclopedia of the Viking Age. Thanes and Hudson, Inc. New York, NY. 2000.
Ingstad, Helge. Friis, Erik trans. Westward to Vinland: The Discovery of Pre-Columbian Norse House-sites in North America. St. Martin's Press. New York, NY. 1969.
Wahlgren, Erik. The Vikings and America. Thames and Hudson, Inc. New York, NY. 1986.
Wooding, Jonathan. The Vikings. Rizzoli International Pub. Inc. New York, NY. 1997.''

External links

Overviews and data
www.disko.gl Site with information and interactive maps of the Disko Bay area.
 Daily updated satellite images from Disko Bay

Government
 Avannaata Official Avannaata municipal and city website
 Qeqertalik Official Qeqertalik municipal and city website

Maps
 
 Phytoplankton Diversity in Disko Bay at the NASA Earth Observatory.

News and media
 Google news Disko Bay
 GEUS Maps of the Disko Bay area

Travel
 Kangia - Ilulissat Icefjord Official website
 North Greenland entry at Visit Greenland – the official Greenlandic Tourist Board tourism website
 A Photographer's View of Disko Bay Documentary produced by Florent Piovesan